Caecum subornatum is a species of minute sea snail, a marine gastropod mollusk or micromollusk in the family Caecidae.

Distribution

Description
The maximum recorded shell length is 2.4 mm.

Habitat
Minimum recorded depth is 24 m. Maximum recorded depth is 30 m.

References

Caecidae
Gastropods described in 1869